Vesna Ratkovna Dolonc (Serbian Cyrillic and ; née Manasieva, Манасиева; born 21 July 1989) is a retired Serbian tennis player. She earned career-highs of 84 in singles and 93 in doubles.

Career
Dolonc began competing on the ITF Circuit in September 2005, soon after her 16th birthday, and had risen to world No. 152 by 28 January 2008.

In February 2006, she won seven successive matches to come through qualifying and reached the semifinals of the $10k event at Portimão, Portugal, and in May 2006, she reached her first $10k final at Kiev, Ukraine. In 2007, she reached the semifinals at Stockholm-Salk ($25k level); Monzón, Spain ($75k level); Moscow ($25k level); and Podolsk, Russia ($25k level). In September 2007, she made it to the finals at the $100k tournament inn Kharkiv, Ukraine.

In 2008, she qualified for her third career WTA Tour main draw at Pattaya, defeated fifth-seeded Angelique Kerber of Germany with the loss of only three games, and reached her first WTA Tour quarterfinals.

Dolonc qualified for the 2011 Australian Open, and in the second round, defeated No. 17 Marion Bartoli in three sets.

In July 2012, she won her second career title in Donetsk.

2013
Dolonc began her season at the Brisbane International. She lost in the first round of qualifying to María José Martínez Sánchez. Despite qualifying for the Australian Open, Dolonc was defeated in the second round by eleventh seed Marion Bartoli.

In Paris at the Open GdF Suez, Dolonc lost in the final round of qualifying to Monica Niculescu. During the Fed Cup tie versus Slovakia, Dolonc won her first rubber when Dominika Cibulková retired due to a leg muscle strain. In her second rubber, she was defeated by Daniela Hantuchová. Serbia ended up losing the tie 2-3.

2014
Dolonc announced her retirement from pro circuit on 14 February 2017 (her last match she played in November 2016).

Performance timelines

Only main-draw results in WTA Tour, Grand Slam tournaments, Fed Cup and Olympic Games are included in win–loss records.

Note: Dolonc played under Russian flag until 2012.

Singles

Doubles

WTA career finals

Doubles: 1 (runner–up)

ITF Circuit finals

Singles: 11 (3 titles, 8 runner-ups)

Doubles: 14 (5 titles, 9 runner-ups)

Personal life
She was born to a Serbian father Ratko Manasiev and a Russian mother. She changed her surname from "Manasieva" to "Dolonc" (Dolonts) when she was married to Arsen Dolonts on 1 October 2010.

Notes

References

External links

 
 
 

1989 births
Living people
Russian female tennis players
Serbian female tennis players
Tennis players from Moscow
Serbian people of Russian descent
Russian people of Serbian descent